In mathematics, a continuum structure function (CSF) is defined by Laurence Baxter as a nondecreasing mapping from the unit hypercube to the unit interval. It is used by Baxter to help in the Mathematical modelling of the level of performance of a system in terms of the performance levels of its components.

References

 Kim, C., Baxter. L. A. (1987) "Axiomatic characterizations of continuum structure functions", Operations Research Letters, 6 (6), 297–300, .

Probabilistic models
Survival analysis